Alejandro Chanona Burguete  is a Mexican academic, researcher and politician from the Citizens' Movement. From 2006 to 2009 he served as Deputy of the LX Legislature of the Mexican Congress representing the Federal District.

References

1957 births
Living people
People from Chiapas
Mexican academics
National Autonomous University of Mexico alumni
Citizens' Movement (Mexico) politicians
21st-century Mexican politicians
Members of the Constituent Assembly of Mexico City
Deputies of the LX Legislature of Mexico
Members of the Chamber of Deputies (Mexico) for Mexico City